The Cerrón Grande Hydroelectric Dam (Spanish: Central Hidroeléctrica Cerrón Grande) spans the Lempa River  north of San Salvador in the municipalities of Potonico, (Chalatenango) and Jutiapa (Cabañas) in El Salvador.

The hydroelectric power plant was fitted with 2 x 67.5 MWe Francis turbines with a total capacity of 135 Mwe. Major maintenance work carried out between 2003 and 2007 included replacing the turbines with 2 x 85 MWe units with a total capacity of 170 MWe, which generate 488 GWh per year.

Cerrón Grande Reservoir

The Cerrón Grande Reservoir (Spanish: Embalse Cerrón Grande), locally known as Lake Suchitlán, is the largest body of fresh water in El Salvador. The area provides a habitat for large numbers of waterbird, duck and fish species.

History 
Because of the construction of the Cerron Grande Hydroelectric Dam, over 13,000 people were displaced with many cantons or townships, caserios or hamlets, churches, cemeteries, and over 20 significant archaeological sites being lost in the process including Canton El Tablon and Canton San Juan in Suchitoto, Cuscatlan.

See also

Electricity sector in El Salvador

References

Hydroelectric power stations in El Salvador
Dams in El Salvador
Dams completed in 1976
Ramsar sites in El Salvador
Cabañas Department
Chalatenango Department